Nalin Perera may refer to:
 Nalin Perera (judge)
 Nalin Perera (singer)
 Nalin Perera (cricketer)